Wilhelm August, Duke of Saxe-Eisenach (30 November 1668 – 23 February 1671) was born at Eisenach, the youngest and only surviving son of Adolf Wilhelm, Duke of Saxe-Eisenach and Marie Elisabeth of Brunswick-Wolfenbüttel.

All his older brothers died before his father, and Wilhelm August, the fifth and youngest child, was born nine days after the death of Adolf Wilhelm (21 November 1668) and succeeded him in the duchy of Saxe-Eisenach from the moment of his birth, under the guardianship of his uncle Johann Georg.

A sickly boy, he died at Eisenach when only two years old, and Eisenach was inherited by Johann Georg.

House of Wettin
1668 births
1671 deaths
People from Eisenach
Dukes of Saxe-Eisenach
Monarchs who died as children